Redmond is a city in Deschutes County, Oregon, United States. Incorporated on July 6, 1910, the city is on the eastern side of Oregon's Cascade Range, in the High Desert in Central Oregon. From Redmond there is access to recreational opportunities.  Redmond is a full-service municipality and one of the fastest-growing industrial and residential communities in Oregon. Redmond had a population of 32,421 in 2019, and the population continues to grow at a rate of about 6.7 percent each year.

History
Redmond was named after Frank T. Redmond, who settled in the area in 1905.
It was platted in 1906 by a company which would become part of Central Oregon Irrigation District building a canal.
Electrification and the Oregon Trunk Railway reached Redmond in 1911. The rail link opened markets for farmers and merchants. By 1930, the town had grown to 1,000 and by 1940 had nearly doubled. In the 1940s, Redmond was a U.S. Army Air base and commercial air service was established at Roberts Field after World War II. From the 1950s through most of the 1980s, the population remained relatively static, growing slowly around a small commercial/retail center and manufacturing industry. However, during the 1990s, the population began to grow along with most of Deschutes County. Between 2000 and 2006, Redmond's population grew 74.3%, placing it among Oregon's fastest-growing cities each year. This growth continued through 2006, increasing the population to 23,500. Its growth is fueled by employment and a lower cost of living.

Geography

The Horse Lava Tube System enters the city at the point of the Redmond Caves. The lava flow that created the system continues into the Redmond Canyon to Crooked River Ranch.

Climate
Redmond's climate is typical of the high desert with cool nights and sunny days.

Hard frosts happen on occasion during the summer months. Autumn usually brings warm, dry days and cooler nights.

Redmond's growing season is short. According to the U.S. Department of Agriculture's National Resources Conservation Service, in half of the years between 1971 and 2000, the USDA weather station in Redmond recorded the last below-freezing temperatures after July 3 and the first below-freezing temperatures before August 31.
Redmond has a steppe climate (BSk) according to the Köppen climate classification system.

Demographics

2010 census
As of the census of 2010, there were 26,215 people, 9,947 households, and 6,789 families residing in the city. The racial makeup of the city was 89.0% White, 0.4% African American, 1.3% Native American, 0.8% Asian, 0.2% Pacific Islander, 5.4% from other races, and 2.9% from two or more races. Hispanic or Latino of any race were 12.5% of the population.

There were 9,947 households, of which 38.6% had children under the age of 18 living with them, 48.7% were married couples living together, 13.9% had a female householder with no husband present, 5.6% had a male householder with no wife present, and 31.7% were non-families. 24.0% of all households were made up of individuals, and 9.6% had someone living alone who was 65 years of age or older. The average household size was 2.61 and the average family size was 3.07.

The median age in the city was 33.9 years. 27.9% of residents were under the age of 18; 8.8% were between the ages of 18 and 24; 28.8% were from 25 to 44; 21.9% were from 45 to 64; and 12.7% were 65 years of age or older. The gender makeup of the city was 48.3% male and 51.7% female.

2000 census
At the census of 2000, there were 13,481 people, 5,260 households, and 3,618 families residing in the city. The population density was 1,316.7 per square mile (508.3/km). There were 5,584 housing units at an average density of 545.4 per square mile (210.5/km). The racial makeup was 93.72% White, 0.09% African American, 1.16% Native American, 0.65% Asian, 0.16% Pacific Islander, 2.14% from other races, and 2.08% from two or more races. Hispanic or Latino of any race were 5.48% of the population.

There were 5,260 households, of which 38.1% had children under 18 living with them, 52.2% were married couples living together, 12.2% had a female householder with no husband present, and 31.2% were non-families. 24.6% of all households were of individuals and 10.6% had someone living alone who was 65 or older. The average household size was 2.54 and the average family size 3.02.

In the city, the population was 29.6% under 18, 8.6% from 18 to 24, 30.6% from 25 to 44, 18.3% from 45 to 64, and 13.0% who were 65 or older. The median age was 33. For every 100 females, there were 93.1 males. For every 100 females 18 and over, there were 88.0 males.

The median income for a household was $33,701, and the median income for a family $41,481. Males had a median of $31,940 versus $23,508 for females. The per capita income was $16,286. About 6.6% of families and 9.7% of the population were below the poverty line, including 8.9% of those under 18 and 7.5% of those 65 or over.

Economy
A major employer is Redmond Air Center, at the Redmond Airport. This is a Forest Service smoke-jumping, firefighting and training installation.

T-Mobile USA had a call center in Redmond which employed more than 700. T-Mobile made plans to close this facility in June 2013, but Oregon-based Consumer Cellular moved to sublease the call center and rehire some of T-Mobile's former employees. As of 2012 the Consumer Cellular call center employed more than 200 people, with plans to grow the facility to 650 employees.

The Redmond Spokesman newspaper is the city's oldest continuously operating business, printing its first issue July 14, 1910. Publishers Henry and Clara Palmer moved their press for the Laidlaw Chronicle to Redmond, competing with the existing Oregon Hub and Enterprise newspapers, now defunct.

Eagle Crest is one of Redmond's major employers, and one of Deschutes County's largest corporate tax payers.

Education
Redmond's total enrollment on September 26, 2006, was 6,892.
 Redmond School District elementary schools serve grades K–5, middle school grades 6–8 and high school 9–12.Redmond School District encompasses  and operates the following 11 schools:
 7 elementary schools, serving grades K–5
 2 middle schools, serving grades 6–8
 2 high schools, serving grades 9–12
 Redmond High School 
 Ridgeview High School
 Private institutions:
 One private Christian school, serving grades pre-kindergarten to 12
 Redmond Proficiency Academy, a grades 6–12 charter school, serving students from Redmond and the greater Central Oregon area
 A secondary campus of George Fox University, affiliated or associated with the Evangelical Friends Alliance

Transportation

Air
Redmond is the location of the region's only commercial airline service airport, Roberts Field. Air carriers include Avelo Airlines, Alaska Airlines, American Airlines, Delta Air Lines and United Airlines with service operated by their respective regional airline affiliates via code sharing agreements.  These carriers provide nonstop service to Burbank, Portland, Seattle, Denver, Salt Lake City, Los Angeles, San Francisco and Phoenix. The U.S. Forest Service operates an air base and training center for firefighting, and Butler Aircraft, a fixed-base operator, flies DC-7 aircraft for firefighting efforts.

Highways
Redmond lies at the intersection of U.S. Route 126 and U.S. Route 97.  The latter runs on an expressway alignment through the city known as the Redmond Parkway.

Rail
A BNSF main line runs north–south through the city; there are numerous spurs off of the main line which serve industrial rail customers.

Points of interest
Eagle Crest Resort
Smith Rock State Park
The Redmond Caves
Deschutes County Fair & Expo
the Deschutes County Fair & Expo Center is 320 Acre multi-purpose facility hosting more than 400 unique events each year.  this state of the art facility opened to the public in 2000, and hosts upwards of 400 unique events annually including the Deschutes County fair & Rodeo, the Northwest Sportsmen Show, Overland Expo PNW, and more.  One of the largest facilities of its type in the nation, this facility is in high demand for concerts, festivals, tradeshows, and consumer shows throughout the year, and remains one of the most visited attractions in Central Oregon with approximalty 1 million annual visitors.  Also home to the First Interstate Bank Center
First Interstate Bank Center
The First Interstate Bank Center is the only facility of its type in Oregon east of the Cascade Range.  Over 300,000 sqaure feet of space under roof, holds 4,000 fixed seats, and the ability to accommodate volleyball, motorsports, wrestling, indoor football, conventions and trade shows. There is over 40,000 square feet of space on the arena floor with an additional 28,250 square feet on the arena concourse. Concession stands are placed on each end of the arena and ticket booths are located on each entrance.  Home to the Central Oregon Storm of the American West Football Conference, as well as the annual Cascade's Futurity, one of the top cutting horses in the nation, the High Desert Stampede PRCA Rodeo, as well as the Columbia River Circuit Finals Rodeo, Sanctuary Barrel Races and many more events each year

Natural history
Some of Redmond's landmark desert flora include:
The Juniper tree, which dots the surrounding brush/desert
The Sagebrush, a medium-high bush which is abundant in undeveloped areas

Notable people
Les AuCoin, a nine-term member of the U.S. House of Representatives from Oregon's First District, grew up in Redmond, attending the city's public schools from the first grade until graduation from Redmond Union High School (as it was called then) in 1960.
Denton G. Burdick, attorney, state representative, and Speaker of the Oregon House of Representatives
Sam Johnson, a longtime member of the Oregon House of Representatives, was elected mayor of Redmond in 1979 and served in that capacity until his death in 1984.
Tom McCall, the 30th Governor of Oregon (from 1967 to 1975), graduated from Redmond High School.
James F. Short, (1902–1986) businessman, rancher, and state legislator
Arthur Tuck, an American track and field athlete who singlehandedly won the 1919 Oregon state high school track and field team championship for Redmond High School.
Jill Twiss, an American actress, writer and comedian known for her work on the HBO show Last Week Tonight with John Oliver and author of the bestselling children's book A Day in the Life of Marlon Bundo.

References

External links

City of Redmond (official website)
Entry for Redmond in the Oregon Blue Book
Redmond Chamber of Commerce

 
Cities in Oregon
Cities in Deschutes County, Oregon
1910 establishments in Oregon
Populated places established in 1910
Populated places established in the 1900s